Aanchal may refer to:

Personal name
 Aanchal Anand, actress
Aanchal Dwivedi, actress
Aanchal Khurana, actress
Aanchal Munjal, Indian actress
Anchal Sabharwal (also known simply as Aanchal), Indian actress
Aanchal Thakur, Indian skier

Film and television
Aanchal (1960 film)
Aanchal (1962 film)
Aanchal (1980 film)
Aanchal (1997 film)
"Aanchal", an episode from season 3 of the Indian television drama Rishtey
Maa Ka Aanchal, 1970 film

Other uses

See also
Anchal (disambiguation)